Yannick Dalmas (born 28 July 1961) is a former racing driver from France. He won the 24 Hours of Le Mans four times (in 1992, 1994, 1995 and 1999), each with different teams. Prior to this, he participated in 49 Formula One Grands Prix, debuting on 18 October 1987, but qualified for only 24 of them. His best result in F1 was a 5th place at the 1987 Australian Grand Prix, but he was not eligible for World Championship points at that race. He recovered before the start of  but his illness had clearly affected him.

In 1994, Dalmas made a brief return to Formula One with cash-strapped Larrousse, but only entered two races. He crashed in Italy, and finished two laps off the lead in Portugal.

Dalmas was French Formula Three champion in 1986.

Racing record

Complete International Formula 3000 results
(key) (Races in bold indicate pole position; races in italics indicate fastest lap.)

Complete Formula One results
(key)

 Dalmas was ineligible to score points in 1987 as he was running in the second Larrousse, and the team had only entered one car for the championship

24 Hours of Le Mans results

References

Profile at grandprix.com

1961 births
Living people
Sportspeople from Var (department)
French racing drivers
French Formula Renault 2.0 drivers
French Formula One drivers
Larrousse Formula One drivers
AGS Formula One drivers
French Formula Three Championship drivers
24 Hours of Le Mans drivers
24 Hours of Le Mans winning drivers
Deutsche Tourenwagen Masters drivers
International Formula 3000 drivers
American Le Mans Series drivers
World Sportscar Championship drivers
12 Hours of Sebring drivers
24 Hours of Daytona drivers
Oreca drivers
Peugeot Sport drivers
Team Joest drivers
Audi Sport drivers
BMW M drivers
Porsche Motorsports drivers
Schnitzer Motorsport drivers
TOM'S drivers